Jonathan David Bobaljik is a Canadian linguist specializing in morphology, syntax, and typology.  Bobaljik received his PhD from the Massachusetts Institute of Technology in 1995 with a thesis titled Morphosyntax: The syntax of verbal inflection advised by Noam Chomsky and David Pesetsky.  He is currently a professor at Harvard University and has previously held positions at McGill University and University of Connecticut.  He is a leading scholar in the area of Distributed Morphology.

In 2012, Bobaljik published a book (Universals in Comparative Morphology: Suppletion, Superlatives and the Structure of Words) on universals in comparative constructions, where he proposes the Comparative-Superlative Generalization.  This book was awarded the Linguistic Society of America's Leonard Bloomfield Book Award.

Bobaljik has worked extensively on the critically endangered Itelmen language.  He has participated in the development of an Itelmen-Russian dictionary, its mobile app, and is currently working on an audio and video dictionary of the language.

References

Selected works

External links

Living people
Linguists from Canada
Year of birth missing (living people)
Massachusetts Institute of Technology alumni
Harvard University faculty
Academic staff of McGill University
University of Connecticut faculty
Fellows of the Linguistic Society of America